Denticulate is an adjective referring to something having teeth-like structures. It may refer to:
 Denticulate tool, a type of stone tool in archeology
 Denticulate leaf, a leaf with finely toothed margins
 Denticulate ligaments, in human anatomy
 a type of conodont prehistoric fish, characterized by the sideward orientation of the major teeth-like projections (denticulate processes)

See also 
 Dentate (disambiguation)